is a Japanese football player. He plays for FC Maruyasu Okazaki.

Playing career
Shunya Ando joined to Fujieda MYFC in 2014. In August, he moved to FC Maruyasu Okazaki.

Club statistics
Updated to 20 February 2016.

References

External links
Profile at FC Maruyasu Okazaki

1991 births
Living people
Tokai Gakuen University alumni
Association football people from Aichi Prefecture
Japanese footballers
J3 League players
Japan Football League players
Fujieda MYFC players
FC Maruyasu Okazaki players
Association football defenders